Diorio is a surname. Notable people with the surname include:

 Derek Diorio, Canadian writer and actor
 Jerry Diorio, American football player
 Joe Diorio, American jazz guitarist
 Nicholas DiOrio, American soccer player
 Ron Diorio, American baseball player
 Tyce Diorio, American dancer
 Verónica Diorio, fictional character from Graduados

See also
 Diorios, village in Cyprus